Live 1966 is a live album by British rock group Small Faces, initially released on 4 June 2021, becoming the first release on drummer Kenney Jones' Nice Records. The album is a remastered soundboard recording of the Small Faces 9 January 1966 performance at the Twenty Club in Mouscron, Belgium.

The material on the album was initially released with a book called Smalls in 2017. However, as Jones wanted to minimize bootlegging he started Nice Records and acquired the original tapes from the performance. Presented here are several recordings the group never recorded in studios. It received primarily positive reviews upon release.

Background 
Live recordings by the Small Faces have always been a rarity, simply because most of their live appearances weren't recorded. Notable exceptions include their appearance on West Germany television show Beat Beat Beat, where they perform four songs, along with In Memoriam or The Autumn Stone, which features five live tracks recorded at Newcastle City Hall. Although their 1999 album The BBC Sessions was marketed as a live album, these were recorded in a studio days before broadcast, essentially making them studio recordings. Besides one BBC session recorded in August 1965, no other live recordings of the Small Faces in 1965 or 1966 have ever surfaced or been recorded, making the Twenty Club performance the earliest.

The recording of Small Faces performing at the Twenty Club initially came from a compact disc included in a book called Smalls. This book was only released in French and was written by Jean-Noël Coghe, who followed the Small Faces on tour in Belgium, documenting the entire trip in the book. Eventually, he arranged for a soundboard recording at the Twenty Club on 9 January 1966 without the knowledge or consent from the Small Faces. Although these were previously unissued tracks, they remained in obscurity due to the fact that the book was only released in France.

Release 
Eventually, the Small Faces drummer Kenney Jones got his hands on the recording, much to his satisfaction. He did this in large part due to secure control over the recordings, stating that "It’s great to launch Nice Records and to be able to take back control of the Small Faces products and recordings", following bootlegging of Small Faces material. The tapes were largely remastered and restored by Tosh Flood and Nick Robbins, both of whom have previously worked on material by the group. Jones has stated that "I have assembled a first-class team who understand the importance of the Small Faces legacy." The sound quality on the original Smalls CD was in much worse shape than the Live 1966 recordings will be, this is due to the fact that the author of Smalls wanted to leave it "as authentic as possible".

Live 1966 was initially released as a digital download release on 4 June 2021, while physical copies weren't released until almost three months later, when the CD version of the album was issued on 3 September. A Double LP will be released on 5 November 2021. This release is set to be pressed on coloured vinyl along with Kenney Jones interviews in the liner notes. With the CD release, Nice Records started distributing physical albums for the first time, with Jones stating "We want to do this properly. There is still previously unreleased material locked away in archives because record companies can’t - or won’t - release it, as well as material that labels lost or never got from the artist in the first place.". Live 1966 will become the first in a series of rare or previously unreleased recordings issue on Nice Records, as unreleased and newly recorded Faces songs will be released soon.

Reception 
Kenney Jones has implied on multiple occasions that he enjoyed playing with the Small Faces during this time, which he thinks this album captures well: "We were a great live act then and even though we started to have hits, our live act was never the same again. This gig is really what the Small Faces were all about" In a review for Making Time, the reviewer praises the sound quality, stating that it gives a very clear sound which helps bring out the clarity and quality of these live recordings, calling the Small Faces "insightful" and saying that the sound quality immerses the listener into a "small club with everyone drenched in sweat" They call it a gem and an "amazing find" and finds the live versions of "E Too D" and "Come On Children" better than the studio versions released on the Small Faces debut album in 1966. The review ends by praising the Small Faces, placing them over any live recordings the Beatles possibly could do.

Track listing

Personnel 

 Steve Marriott – lead vocals, rhythm and lead guitar
 Ronnie Lane – bass guitar, lead and backing vocals
 Ian McLagan – Hammond organ, backing vocals
 Kenney Jones – drums

References 

2021 live albums
Live rock albums
Small Faces albums